The Networked Readiness Index is an index published annually by the World Economic Forum in collaboration with INSEAD, as part of their annual Global Information Technology Report. It aims to measure the degree of readiness of countries to exploit opportunities offered by information and communications technology.

The 2016 edition covers 139 nations.

References

Global economic indicators
Index numbers
IT infrastructure